Palmitoylation is the covalent attachment of fatty acids, such as palmitic acid, to cysteine (S-palmitoylation) and less frequently to serine and threonine (O-palmitoylation) residues of proteins, which are typically membrane proteins. The precise function of palmitoylation depends on the particular protein being considered.  Palmitoylation enhances the hydrophobicity of proteins and contributes to their membrane association.  Palmitoylation also appears to play a significant role in subcellular trafficking of proteins between membrane compartments, as well as in modulating protein–protein interactions. In contrast to prenylation and myristoylation, palmitoylation is usually reversible (because the bond between palmitic acid and protein is often a thioester bond). The reverse reaction in mammalian cells is catalyzed by acyl-protein thioesterases (APTs) in the cytosol and palmitoyl protein thioesterases in lysosomes. Because palmitoylation is a dynamic, post-translational process, it is believed to be employed by the cell to alter the subcellular localization, protein–protein interactions, or binding capacities of a protein.

An example of a protein that undergoes palmitoylation is hemagglutinin, a membrane glycoprotein used by influenza to attach to host cell receptors. The palmitoylation cycles of a wide array of enzymes have been characterized in the past few years, including H-Ras, Gsα, the β2-adrenergic receptor, and endothelial nitric oxide synthase (eNOS). In signal transduction via G protein, palmitoylation of the α subunit, prenylation of the γ subunit, and myristoylation is involved in tethering the G protein to the inner surface of the plasma membrane so that the G protein can interact with its receptor.

Mechanism
S-palmitoylation is generally done by proteins with the DHHC domain. Exceptions exist in non-enzymatic reactions. Acyl-protein thioesterase (APT) catalyses the reverse reaction. Other acyl groups such as stearate (C18:0) or oleate (C18:1) are also frequently accepted, more so in plant and viral proteins, making S-acylation a more useful name.

Several structures of the DHHC domain have been determined using X-ray crystallography. It contains a linearly-arranged catalytic triad of Asp153, His154, and Cys156. It runs on a ping-pong mechanism, where the cysteine attacks the acyl-CoA to form an S-acylated DHHC, and then the acyl group is transferred to the substrate. DHHR enzymes exist, and it (as well as some DHHC enzymes) may use a ternary complex mechanism instead.

An inhibitor of S-palmitoylation by DHHC is 2-Bromopalmitate (2-BP). 2-BP is a nonspecific inhibitor that also halts many other lipid-processing enzymes.

The palmitoylome
A meta-analysis of 15 studies produced a compendium of approximately 2,000 mammalian proteins that are palmitoylated. The highest associations of the palmitoylome are with cancers and disorders of the nervous system. Approximately 40% of synaptic proteins were found in the palmitoylome.

Biological function

Substrate presentation
Palmitoylation mediates the affinity of a protein for lipid rafts and facilitates the clustering of proteins. The clustering can increase the proximity of two molecules. Alternatively, clustering can sequester a protein away from a substrate. For example, palmitoylation of phospholipase D (PLD) sequesters the enzyme away from its substrate phosphatidylcholine. When cholesterol levels decrease or PIP2 levels increase the palmitate mediated localization is disrupted, the enzyme trafficks to PIP2 where it encounters its substrate and is active by substrate presentation.

Synapse formation
Scientists have appreciated the significance of attaching long hydrophobic chains to specific proteins in cell signaling pathways.  A good example of its significance is in the clustering of proteins in the synapse.  A major mediator of protein clustering in the synapse is the postsynaptic density (95kD) protein PSD-95.  When this protein is palmitoylated it is restricted to the membrane.  This restriction to the membrane allows it to bind to and cluster ion channels in the postsynaptic membrane.  Also, in the presynaptic neuron, palmitoylation of SNAP-25 directs it to partition in the cell membrane  and allows the SNARE complex to dissociate during vesicle fusion.  This provides a role for palmitoylation in regulating neurotransmitter release.

Palmitoylation of delta catenin seems to coordinate activity-dependent changes in synaptic adhesion molecules, synapse structure, and receptor localizations that are involved in memory formation.

Palmitoylation of gephyrin has been reported to influence GABAergic synapses.

See also
 DHHC domain
 Myristoylation
 Myelin proteolipid protein
 Palmitoleoylation
 Prenylation

References

Further reading

Resh, M. (2006) "Palmitoylation of Ligands, Receptors, and Intracellular Signaling Molecules". Sci STK. 359 October 31.

External links
CSS-Palm - Palmitoylation Site Prediction with a Clustering and Scoring Strategy
CKSAAP-Palm
Swisspalm - S-Palmitoylation database

Peripheral membrane proteins
Post-translational modification